Shaharpara is a village of historical importance in the south-eastern part of Sunamganj District, Bangladesh. It was founded in 1315 CE by Shah Kamal Quhafah and his disciples. It is approximately one hour drive away from the city of Sylhet and also from Sunamganj. The village is at the heart of the Sylhet Division and nestles on the bank of the river Ratna.

Etymology
The name Shaharpara derived from the title of its founder, Shah Kamal. 'Shah' means 'monarch', 'ar' (variant of 'er') means 'of' and 'para' means 'village' or 'footstep'; Shaharpara is a compound of Shah, ar and para (Shah+ar+para=Shaharpara), which is attributed to the footsteps of Shah Kamal Quhafah. Literal meaning of Shaharpara is 'footsteps of Shah', referring to the footsteps of Shah Kamal. It was when Shah Kamal Quhafah alighted himself on an island to survey the terrain for settlement and when a settlement was established, it inherited the phrase 'Shaharpara' as an honour for the settlement and ascription to Shah Kamal Quhafah.

Origin of Shaharpara

Shaharpara is a village that nestles on the bank of river Ratna in Syedpur Shaharpara Union Parishad, Jagannathpur upazila, Sunamganj district, Sylhet Division of Bangladesh.  In 1315 CE, Shah Kamal Quhafah established a settlement on a group of islands in Ratnang Sea.  Nowadays, it lies on the bank of river Ratna (river Ratna is a remnant of erstwhile Ratnang Sea). The settlement of Shah Kamal Quhafah became an epicentre for spiritual occurrence, academic and esoteric learning. Gradually, it transformed into a mega village enticing a number of adjoining islets when they transmuted into hamlets: Kamalshahi, Tilak, Mirpur, Muftirchawk, Nurainpur, Lalarchar, Kurikiyar and Noagaon. From ancient to medieval periods, Jagannathpur upazila and all of its bordering upazilas were submerged in a vast sea by the name of Ratnag.

Kamalshahi
Kamalshahi, aka Kamalshah, was founded by Shah Muazzamuddin Qureshi and it was named in honour of his father, Shah Kamal Quhafah. Kamalshahi was the capital of Muazzamabad and centre of academic and esoteric learning. At present, Kamalshahi has lost its past grandeur, but mausoleums of Shah Kamal Quhafa, his wife and children are sites for historical and archaeological interests.

Tilak
Tilak was a settlement established by kith and kin of ‘Moi’ or ‘Mai’, who was a female disciple of Shah Kamal Quhafah. Family and friends of Moi came to Shaharpara from Moi’erchar or Moiyarchar in southwest of Sylhet and they established a settlement on an islet of Shaharpara archipelago, which later came to be known as 'Tilak', as Moi's family belong to a Brahmanic denomination that required them wearing a mark on their forehead called, tilak, and the settlement later derived its name from that insignia on their forehead. At present, Tilak is considered as a hamlet of Greater Shaharpara.

Muftirchawk
Muftirchawk was an estate of Mufti Da’eem Uddin Qureshi of Mullah Barhi and it was named after his appellation of mufti. Mufti Da’eem Uddin Qureshi returned to Shaharpara on vacations and married his paternal cousin. Descendants of Mufti Da’eem Uddin Qureshi have settled in Dargah Mahalla, Sylhet.  Mufti Da’eem Uddin Qureshi's eldest son, Maulana Zia Uddin Qureshi, was a philanthropist, who founded the very first school in Sylhet.

Nurainpur
Nurainpur is a hamlet within the periphery of Shaharpara; it was established by Shah Nurain Uddin Qureshi and thus named after him. Shah Nurain Uddin Qureshi was a descendant of Shah Kamal Quhafah; he was a social activist, who dedicated most of his life for welfare of people and societal improvement.

Mirpur
Mirpur hosted a garrison from the formation of Muazzamabad until it was annexed and absorbed by the Mughal Empire of Delhi.

Consanguinity
People of Shaharpara are related to each other; this is because most of them have descended from three sons of Shah Kamal Quḥāfah and their surnames are Shah, Khwaja, Kamali or Kamaly, Qureshi, Mufti and Siddiqui after their ancestor Shah Kamal Quḥāfah, who settled on the bank of river Ratna and founded a village that was named "Shaharpara" (derived from his first name). Family ties and relations with other clans are strikingly similar to that of the Arab tribes. Descendants of Shah Kamal Quhafah have extended to five families: Mullah Family, Baglar Family and Shahjee Family in Shaharpara, Qureshi Family in Patli and Mufti Family in Sylhet Dargah Mahallah. Maulana Shah Shamsuddin Qureshi, who was a descendant of Shah Kamal Quhafah, established the Qureshi Family in Patli and Maulana Shah Zia Uddin, another descendant of Shah Kamal Quhafah, established the Mufti Family in Dargah Mahallah, Sylhet. Today the Kamali population stands at approximately 5000 and most of them have immigrated to western countries for a better life, but they maintain a website that aims to bring the clan members together.

History
In 1303, Shah Jalal Yamani vanquished Sylhet with aid of his 360 disciples and the military might of Sultan Shamsuddin Firoz Shah. After about a decade of Muslim governance of Sylhet, an expedition of 12 Sufi disciples was sent to Sunamganj under the leadership of Shah Kamal Quḥāfah, commonly known as Shah Kamal, son of Khwaja Burhanuddin Quḥāfah, who was a commander and companion of Shah Jalal. The expedition suffered due a turbulent rainfall of monsoon season and thus Shah Kamal Quḥāfah ended up near a village called Tilak in Jagannathpur upazillah in Sunamganj District with his disciples. It is assumed that the expedition was less adventurous because Shah Kamal Quḥāfah was accompanied by his Arab wife, who was not accustomed to the local weather. Shah Kamal Quḥāfah with his 12 disciples settled on the bank of river Ratna. These twelve Sufi disciples of Shah Kamal Quḥāfah are as follows:

1. Pir Kallu Shah, 2. Shah Chand, 3. Dawar Bakhsh Khatib, 4. Dilwar Bakhsh Khatib, 5. Shaikh Shamsuddin Bihari, 6. Shah Faizullah, 7. Shah Jalaluddin, 8. Syed Tajuddin, 9. Syed Bahauddin, 10. Syed Ruknuddin, 11. Syed Shamsuddin and 12. Shah Manik.

After Shah Kamal Quḥāfah founded a settlement on the bank of river Ratna, which is nowadays known as Shaharpara, though initially it was Shahpara, he established a mosque and khanqah in Shaharpara proper. Shah Kamal Quḥāfah came to Sylhet with his wife from Mecca in Saudi Arabia and she begot three sons and a daughter. Three sons of Shah Kamal Quḥāfah were Shah Jalaluddin Qureshi, Shah Muazamuddin Qureshi and Shah Jamaluddin Qureshi. State of Muazzamabad (Iqlim-i-Muazzamabad) was established by Shah Muazzamuddin Qureshi. Silhat was conquered in 1384, and its north-western thana contained the mint town of Muazzamabad. Around 1620 CE, Mughal annexed Muazzamabad and Sylhet; the seat of administration was transferred from Shaharpara and Sylhet to Sonargaon. Sonargaon comprised two iqlims, which is evidenced in inscriptions of Bengal:  one stretching towards east and north-east, called iqlim e Muazzamabad, and the other stretching towards west and south-west keeping Dhaka in the middle, called iqlim e Mubarakabad.

Economy
Greater Shaharpara has a number of markets, emporiums and bazaar where people from neighbouring villages and beyond trade. Shaharpara Bazaar is largest amongst other bazaar in the area.

Education
Shaharpara has a number of primary schools, one seminary by the name of Shah Kamal Madrasa and one high school by the name of Shaharpara Shah Kamal High School.

See also
 List of villages in Bangladesh
 Jagannathpur Upazila
 Syedpur Shaharpara Union
 Budhrail
 Islampur, Jagannathpur

References 

Villages in Jagannathpur Upazila